Byblos Bank (abbreviated as BYB) is a Lebanese bank established in 1963 and headquartered in Beirut, Lebanon. It is the country’s third largest bank by assets. It is one of the Alpha banks in Lebanon, along with Banque Libano-Française S.A.L. (BLF), Bank Audi, BLOM Bank, and Fransabank, which are its main competitors. As at 31 July 2018, it operates 88 branches in Lebanon.

History
Byblos Bank was initially founded in 1950 as “Société Commerciale et Agricole Byblos Bassil Frères & Co.”, a Lebanese company specialized in natural silk, leather tanning, and agricultural credit activities. In 1961, the company’s name was changed to “Société Bancaire Agricole Byblos Bassil Frères & Co.”, and in 1963 it was established as Byblos Bank S.A.L and registered at the newly established Banque du Liban.

The initial founders include Semaan Melkan Bassil, Youssef Melkan Bassil, Victor Fernainé and Fouad Fernainé, all hailing from powerful families based in the ancient Phoenician town of Byblos, north of Beirut. François Bassil, the current Chairman of Byblos Bank Group, contributed to the establishment of Byblos Bank S.A.L in 1963.

International partnerships
Byblos Bank has established partnerships with several international entities including: the International Finance Corporation (IFC), which is the private sector arm of the World Bank Group, the Agence française de développement (AFD), which is a public institution providing development financing and its subsidiary, the Société de Promotion et Participation pour la Coopération Economique (PROPARCO). These institutions are among the Bank’s most notable shareholders. In 2009, Byblos Bank appointed The Bank of New York Mellon as depositary bank.

Listing and areas served
Byblos Bank is listed on the Beirut Stock Exchange (BYB) and became in 2009 the first Lebanese issuer to be listed on the London Stock Exchange. It also actively operates in 9 countries in the Middle East, Europe, and Africa including: the United Kingdom, France, Belgium, Armenia, Cyprus, the United Arab Emirates, Iraq, and Nigeria.

See also

List of Banks in Lebanon
Banque du Liban
Economy of Lebanon
Semaan Bassil
Joumana Bassil Chelala
François Bassil
Bank of Beirut
 Cedrus Bank
 Banque Libano-Française
 First National Bank
 Intercontinental Bank of Lebanon (IBL)
 Lebanon and Gulf Bank
 Saradar Bank
 AM Bank (Al-Mawarid Bank)

References

External links
 

Banks of Lebanon
1963 establishments in Lebanon
Companies based in Beirut